Arif Hüdai Oral (1925 – 13 February 2005) was a Turkish lawyer, politician and former government minister.

Life
Hüdai Oral was born in Buldan ilçe (district) of Denizli Province in 1925. After completing the Law school of Istanbul University, he served as an attorney in Denizli. He was married  to Perihan Oral, and was father of a daughter Tansu and a son Teoman. He died on 13 February 2005 in Denizli due to  respiratory syndrome.

Political life
Hüdai Oral joined the Republican People's Party (CHP) and was elected a deputy from Denizli Province entering the 12th Parliament of Turkey on 15 October 1961. He kept his seat in the 13th, 14th and the 15th Parliament of Turkey.
In the 28th government of Turkey, the  Ministry of Energy and Natural Resources was established, and Hüdai Oral was appointed as the first government minister of this portfolio. He served between 25 December 1963 and 20 February 1965.

Following the 1980 Turkish coup d'état, CHP was banned. He became one of the charter members of Social Democracy Party (SODEP) in 1983. After SODEP and Populist Party (HP) merged to form the Social Democratic Populist Party (SHP), he was elected a deputy from Denizli Province for the last time during the 18th Parliament of Turkey.

References

1925 births
People from Buldan
Istanbul University Faculty of Law alumni
20th-century Turkish lawyers
Deputies of Denizli
Members of the 12th Parliament of Turkey
Members of the 13th Parliament of Turkey
Members of the 14th Parliament of Turkey
Members of the 15th Parliament of Turkey
Members of the 18th Parliament of Turkey
Members of the 28th government of Turkey
Republican People's Party (Turkey) politicians
Social Democracy Party (Turkey) politicians
Social Democratic Populist Party (Turkey) politicians
Ministers of Energy and Natural Resources of Turkey
Deaths from respiratory failure
2005 deaths
Deputy Speakers of the Grand National Assembly of Turkey